Mehdi Baala (born 17 August 1978 in Strasbourg) is a French middle-distance runner competing mainly in the 1500 metres event. Baala has won several major international championships medals in the 1500 metres event – an Olympic Games bronze, a World Championships silver, two European Championships golds and a European Indoor Championships bronze. Moreover, he has won several medals in the 1500 metres event of the European Cup,  IAAF World Cup and the IAAF World Athletics Final. Baala is considered to be the best French middle-distance runner of all time. As of July 2013, he holds French national outdoor records for four distances (800m: 1.43.15, 1000m: 2.13.96, 1500m: 3.28.98 and 2000m: 4.53.12; all of these were set from 2002 to 2005) and French national indoor records for four distances (800m, 1000m, 1500m and the mile; all of these were set from 2003 to 2009).

Baala won the silver medal at the 2003 World Championships in the 1500 metres event. At the 2007 World Championships in Osaka in 2007, he finished first in his 1500 metres semi-final heat but was disqualified for causing the fall of two other athletes.

Baala finished fourth in the 1500 metres final at the 2000 Olympics. At the 2008 Olympics, Baala won the bronze medal for the 1500 metres event. He had initially finished in fourth place in the final once again, but the initial winner Rashid Ramzi was stripped of his gold medal when he was found guilty of doping and hence Baala was elevated to receive the bronze medal.

On 22 July 2011, immediately after the 1500m race of the Monaco meeting of the IAAF Diamond League, Baala and his fellow competitor and compatriot Mahiedine Mekhissi-Benabbad traded blows on the track.  The French Athletics Federation handed Baala and Mekhissi-Benabbad   a suspension of 10 months each – 5 months suspended – from all European Athletics and IAAF track meets. Both were each fined 1500 euros and ordered to perform 50 hours of community service. Baala and Mekhissi-Benabbad were nevertheless cleared to take part in the upcoming 2011 World Championships

Results in international competitions
Note: Only the position and time in the final are indicated, unless otherwise stated; if the athlete did not qualify for the final, the overall position and time in the first round heats or semifinals are indicated.

References

External links

 
 

1978 births
Living people
French male middle-distance runners
Athletes (track and field) at the 2000 Summer Olympics
Athletes (track and field) at the 2004 Summer Olympics
Athletes (track and field) at the 2008 Summer Olympics
Olympic athletes of France
Olympic bronze medalists for France
French sportspeople of Algerian descent
Sportspeople from Strasbourg
World Athletics Championships medalists
European Athletics Championships medalists
Medalists at the 2008 Summer Olympics
Olympic bronze medalists in athletics (track and field)
20th-century French people
21st-century French people